Main Street Historic District is a national historic district located at Roxbury in Delaware County, New York. The district contains 86 contributing buildings, three contributing sites, three contributing structures, and one contributing object.  The southern end of the district is dominated by the Gothic Revival style Jay Gould Memorial Reformed Church (1892), the Roxbury Central School (1939), and the Kirkside estate.  Located nearby is a Greek Revival style Methodist church erected in 1858.  Financier Jay Gould was raised nearby and in the 1890s began an interest in the development of Roxbury.

It was listed on the National Register of Historic Places in 1988.

Gallery

See also
National Register of Historic Places listings in Delaware County, New York

References

External links
History of the Reformed Church of Roxbury, NY

Historic districts on the National Register of Historic Places in New York (state)
National Register of Historic Places in Delaware County, New York
Neoclassical architecture in New York (state)
Italianate architecture in New York (state)
Historic districts in Delaware County, New York